Adventure Gamers is a computer game website created by Marek Bronstring in March 1998 dedicated to the genre of adventure games. It publishes reviews and previews of adventure games, as well as opinion articles and interviews with game designers.

The site's reviews have been quoted on many adventure game box covers, and it is listed as a trusted reviewer on CNET's Metacritic and GameRankings. Adventure Gamers was also referenced in the print book Rogue Leaders: The Story of LucasArts.

Adventure Gamers is respected by developers of adventure games. Ragnar Tornquist, the creator of the adventure games The Longest Journey and Dreamfall: The Longest Journey, has stated that the reviews on Adventure Gamers are "very important to [him]". In addition, Straandlooper, the developer of Hector: Badge of Carnage, called Adventure Gamers "one of the foremost and widely respected websites about adventure games".

The Aggie Awards
Every year starting from 2009, Adventure Gamers hosts the Aggie Awards, which award adventure games of the previous year for their merits in several categories from concept, art direction, and story, to the adventure game of the year. The categories are divided in choices made by website staff and by readers. These awards are held in high regard by the companies who receive them, as they are featured on official covers of those games.

See also

Just Adventure

Notes

References

External links
 

Video game news websites
Internet properties established in 1998
Video game genre websites